Fearless is the third EP by Taiwanese singer Jay Chou, released on 20 January 2006 by Alfa Music.

Track listing
 "Fearless" (霍元甲) 
 "Face the World" (獻世) (Cantonese) (Original artist: Jordan Chan)
Bonus MVs from November's Chopin
 "Nocturne" (夜曲)
 "Blue Storm" (藍色風暴)
 "Hair Like Snow" (發如雪)
 "Black Sweater" (黑色毛衣)
 "Besieged From All Sides" (四面楚歌)
 "Maple" (楓)
 "Romantic Cellphone" (浪漫手機)
 "Reverse Scale" (逆鱗)
 "Malt Candy" (麥芽糖)
 "Coral Sea" (珊瑚海)
 "Drifting" (飄移)
 "All the Way North" (一路向北)

Awards

References

External links
  Jay Chou discography@JVR Music

2006 EPs
Mandopop EPs
Jay Chou albums
Sony Music Taiwan albums